Yoro, with a population of 25,560 (2020 calculation), is the capital city of the Yoro Department of Honduras and the municipal seat of Yoro Municipality. It is notable for a local event known as Lluvia de Peces, where it is claimed that strong storms make fish fall from the sky.

Demographics
At the time of the 2013 Honduras census, Yoro municipality had a population of 86,665. Of these, 86.52% were Mestizo, 10.65% Indigenous (10.05% Tolupan, 0.41% Lenca), 1.98% White, 0.80% Black or Afro-Honduran and 0.05% others.

References

Municipalities of the Yoro Department